Frederick Harkness Humphreys (28 January 1878 – 10 August 1954) was a British tug of war competitor and sport wrestler who competed in the 1908 Summer Olympics in London, in the 1912 Summer Olympics in Stockholm, and in the 1920 Summer Olympics in Antwerp. He was also a constable in the City of London Police, collar number 970, as were two of his brothers.

He was part of the British team City of London Police which won two gold medals in 1908 and 1920 and the joint City of London Police-Metropolitan Police "K" Division British team which won a silver medal in 1912. There were no games in 1916 due to World War I.

He also competed in wrestling, and took part in demonstration bouts around Europe and the United Kingdom. In the 1908 Olympic Greco-Roman super heavyweight competition he was eliminated in the first round and in the freestyle heavyweight event he was eliminated in the quarter-finals.

In May 2013, some of his medals, including the 1912 silver and 1920 gold, as well as family photographs, were shown on an episode of a BBC television programme by two of his great-nieces. They stated that the whereabouts of his 1908 gold medal are unknown.

References

External links
profile

1878 births
1954 deaths
Athletes from London
Olympic wrestlers of Great Britain
Olympic tug of war competitors of Great Britain
Wrestlers at the 1908 Summer Olympics
British male sport wrestlers
Tug of war competitors at the 1908 Summer Olympics
Tug of war competitors at the 1912 Summer Olympics
Tug of war competitors at the 1920 Summer Olympics
English Olympic medallists
Olympic gold medallists for Great Britain
Olympic silver medallists for Great Britain
Olympic medalists in tug of war
Medalists at the 1920 Summer Olympics
Medalists at the 1912 Summer Olympics
Medalists at the 1908 Summer Olympics
City of London Police officers